Coccinelle, Jacqueline Charlotte Dufresnoy (1931–2006), was a French transsexual actress and entertainer.

Coccinelle may also refer to:

Transportation
 SIPA S.1000 Coccinelle, a French-built light civil utility aircraft of the 1950s
 Pottier P.130 Coccinelle, a French light aircraft originating from one designed, but not built, in the 1960s
 Volkswagen Beetle (French nickname), a German car (1938–2003)
 Volkswagen Coccinelle, the model Volkswagen Beetle (A5) (2011-on)
 Citroën Coccinelle, a project of the Citroën 2CV

Other uses
 Coccinelle (software), a framework for refactoring of C source code

See also
 Coccinellidae, the ladybug or ladybird beetle family (French: coccinelle)

fr:Coccinelle